The Gasconade County R-I School District is a public school district located in the rural town of Hermann, Missouri in northern Gasconade County. The district contains Hermann Elementary School, which serves students from grades K-3. The campus's address is 328 West 7th Street. The district also contains a middle school and high school located in the same proximity of each other. Hermann Middle School serves students from grades 4-8 and its address is 164 Blue Pride Drive. Hermann High School serves students from grades 9-12 and its address is 176 Bearcat Crossing. The current superintendent of the district is Dr. Geoff Neill. The district's school board contains 7 members, but there are currently 6 that are filled with an election being held in April 2023. The current board members include Becky Whithaus, Mark Brooks, Jeff Englert, Kevin Stiers, Mike Pratte, and Board President Dot Schoening. The district's colors are blue and white, and its mascot is a Bearcat, a viverrid animal that is native to South and Southeast Asia.

References

Missouri
Schools in Missouri